This article includes lists of all Southeast Asian Games medalists since 1959, organised by each sport or discipline, and also by each edition of the games.

Medalist with most medals by sport

Medalist with most medals by each edition of the Games
The following is a list of top medalist athlete in every edition. All of the athletes below competing in swimming competition.

See also
List of multiple Southeast Asian Games medalists

medalists
medalists